DIN 1.2344 tool steel (also known as AISI H13 steel or just H13) is a tool steel grade standardised for hot working.  The main feature of this grade is the combination of alloyed elements of chromium, molybdenum and vanadium, Cr-Mo-V, which provides a high wear resistance to thermal shock.  It is well known as for its great strength, and heat resistance. It is heavily used for die casting  and the cold heading field.
The presence of high vanadium in DIN 1.2344 can handle the abrasion at both low and high temperatures.  It always provides a uniform and high level of machinability. This tool steel is mostly used for aluminum, magnesium and zinc die casting.

AISI, stands for American Iron and Steel Institute. Also it was standardised as SKD 61 by Japanese Industrial Standards.

The surface can be nitrided to improve wear resistance.

Application

DIN 1.2344 is widely used in various places in both cold and hot working. In hot work processing DIN 1.2344 shear knives and dummy block extrusion can be used. In cold work process this steel is used for punching, heading and inserting of die blocks.
DIN 1.2344 is a high hot-wear resistance and great strength, warm conductivity air hardening and invulnerability to hot cracking. It has a great resistance to abrasion at each low and high temperature due to the presence of high vanadium. The high level of toughness and ductility made it a useful material for die casting and the cold heading field.

Chemical composition

References

Extra reading

Steels